Johan Ibo (born 19 September 1985 in Atamali, Papua, Indonesia) is an Indonesian footballer who currently plays for PS Barito Putera in the Indonesia Super League.

His brother Andri Ibo is also a professional footballer who currently plays for Persipura Jayapura in the Indonesia Super League.

References

External links
 

1985 births
Association football defenders
Living people
Indonesian footballers
Liga 1 (Indonesia) players
Pelita Jaya FC players
Persebaya Surabaya players
Arema F.C. players
Sportspeople from Papua